Yuinmery Station is a pastoral lease that once operated as a sheep station and currently operates as a cattle station. The western boundary of the station adjoins Youanmi Downs and the southern boundary adjoins vacant crown land and Cashmere Downs Station.

Yuinmery was taken up in 1917 by William Gerald Lefroy, who moved from Carramarra, Moora, and has remained in the Lefroy family ever since. Originally the station ran sheep, producing wool, however the increased incidence of wild dogs meant that the property was converted to cattle in the 21st century.

Yuinnmery has a near new four bedroom two bathroom homestead and separate cottage. The station has 35 watering points and  a carrying capacity of 9,110 sheep or 1,300 head of cattle. When last advertised the property was stocked with 120 head of Shorthorn and Brahman heifers and was priced at 720,000.

A minute bat named Vespadelus baverstocki, a desert inhabiting insectivore, was first described using a specimen shot at this location.

See also
List of ranches and stations

References

Mid West (Western Australia)
Pastoral leases in Western Australia
Stations (Australian agriculture)